LGI or lgi may refer to:

 Lance-grenade individuel Mle F1 (LGI Mle F1), a French grenade launcher
 Leeds General Infirmary, England
 Lengilu language (ISO code: lgi), a language of Borneo
 LGI Homes, US
 Lion Global Investors, a subsidiary of OCBC Bank
 Late Glacial Interstadial (c. 14,670 BP to c. 12,890 BP)
 Deadman's Cay Airport (IATA code: LGI), Long Island, Bahamas

See also

 
 Lg1 (disambiguation)